Selway National Forest was established by the U.S. Forest Service in Idaho on July 1, 1911 with  from parts of Clearwater National Forest and Nez Perce National Forest. On October 29, 1934 the entire forest was divided between Bitterroot, Clearwater, Lolo and Nez Perce, and the name was discontinued.

References

External links
Forest History Society
Listing of the National Forests of the United States and Their Dates (from Forest History Society website) Text from Davis, Richard C., ed. Encyclopedia of American Forest and Conservation History. New York: Macmillan Publishing Company for the Forest History Society, 1983. Vol. II, pp. 743-788.

Former National Forests of Idaho